Stone'd Records is a British independent record label founded by Grammy winning soul singer Joss Stone after her split from longtime label EMI. Stone has stated that the label is to be "a safe haven where great artists are free to do what they do best, create real music without compromise." At the time the label was set up, it was announced that longtime music executive Brian Nelson had been appointed General Manager of Stone'd Records and that the first signing besides Stone herself were Bristol based ska punk band Yes Sir Boss!.

Current artists
 Joss Stone

Former artists
 Yes Sir Boss

Discography

Studio albums

Extended plays

References

External links

British independent record labels
Companies based in Bristol
Record labels established in 2011